Benjamin Gifford (September 13, 1833 - July 14, 1901) was an American soldier who fought in the American Civil War. Gifford received his country's highest award for bravery during combat, the Medal of Honor. Gifford's medal was won for his capturing the flag during the Battle of Sailor's Creek on April 6, 1865. He was honored with the award on May 10, 1865.

Gifford was born in German Flatts, New York. He joined the Army in August 1862, and mustered out with his regiment in June 1865. Gifford was buried in Hinsdale, New York.

Medal of Honor citation

See also
List of American Civil War Medal of Honor recipients: G–L

References

1833 births
1901 deaths
American Civil War recipients of the Medal of Honor
People from German Flatts, New York
People of New York (state) in the American Civil War
Union Army soldiers
United States Army Medal of Honor recipients